The Council of Europe Convention on the Avoidance of Statelessness in Relation to State Succession is a treaty that aims to ensure that people are not left without a nationality when one or more states replace their state of nationality. Such cases occur when individuals lose the nationality of the replaced state but do not acquire that of any replacing state. This convention builds on the European Convention on Nationality to establish detailed rules to prevent these cases.

In response to a growing risk of statelessness from a "wave" of state succession in Eastern Europe in the 1990s and 2000s, the United Nations General Assembly encouraged states to consider developing legal instruments to regulate the ensuing issues of nationality. This treaty remains the only "positive response" to that encouragement.

Parties and signatories

The treaty has seven states parties and two signatories that have not ratified. All are members of the Council of Europe. In 2019, the Commissioner for Human Rights noted that many members had not joined international "instruments on statelessness and nationality", and "only seven" had joined this convention. The Commissioner urged members to do so as part of a campaign to eradicate statelessness.

References

External links
 Text of the convention

Council of Europe treaties
Human rights instruments
Nationality treaties
Statelessness
Treaties concluded in 2006
Treaties entered into force in 2009
Treaties of Austria
Treaties of Germany
Treaties of Hungary
Treaties of Luxembourg
Treaties of Montenegro
Treaties of the Netherlands
Treaties of Norway
Treaties of Moldova
Treaties of Ukraine